Code 37, also known as Code 37: Sex Crimes in English-speaking countries, is a Belgian television crime-drama. In both the U.S. and the UK, the series is shown on Walter Presents.

Content
The series focuses on a police unit, in particular its chief investigator Hannah Maes, specializing in sexual offenses such as rape, incest, pornography, abuse, pedophilia, exhibitionism, harassment and discrimination. There is also an ongoing sub-plot focusing on a home invasion that happened to Maes and her parents eight years earlier.

Cast
 Veerle Baetens as Hannah Maes
 Michael Pas as Bob De Groof
 Marc Lauwrys as Charles Ruiters
 Gilles De Schryver as Kevin Desmet
 Geert Van Rampelberg as Koen Verberk
 Carry Goossens as Robert Maes
 Ben Segers as Mark Vermaelen
 Mieke De Groote as Greet Adriaans
 Herman Gilis as Erwin Struelens
 Clara Cleymans as Vicky Renders

References

External links

Belgian crime television series
Belgian drama television shows
2009 Belgian television series debuts
2012 Belgian television series endings
2010s Belgian television series
2000s Belgian television series
Flemish television shows
VTM (TV channel) original programming